Ismene (minor planet designation: 190 Ismene) is a very large main belt asteroid. It was discovered by German-American astronomer C. H. F. Peters on September 22, 1878, in Clinton, New York, and named after Ismene, the sister of Antigone in Greek mythology.

Being a P-type asteroid, it has a very dark surface. Ismene orbits near the outer edge of the asteroid belt. It is one of the largest members of the Hilda asteroid family, which are locked in 3:2 resonance with the planet Jupiter.

References

External links
 
 

Hilda asteroids
Ismene
Ismene
P-type asteroids (Tholen)
X-type asteroids (SMASS)
18780922